Kranes konditori (Krane's Café) is a Norwegian drama film from 1951 directed by Astrid Henning-Jensen. Henning-Jensen also wrote the screenplay, which was based on Cora Sandel's novel of the same name.

Plot
The film takes place in a small Norwegian coastal town and follows the life of Katinka Stordal (Rønnaug Alten). The film depicts her loneliness and longing for love. The only man she has ever loved has left her without saying goodbye. From her children she receives neither tenderness nor kindness—only hard, cold demands. Katinka fights to keep her home together. One day she meets the Swedish sailor Stivhatten (Erik Hell) at Krane's Café. There is fresh gossip about the meeting between them in the town, and Katinka's behavior arouses outrage among many: Is she thinking of leaving her home and children?

Reception
The newspaper Verdens Gang praised the solid acting in the film, but complained about stiff camera work. The newspaper wrote that "The drama was intended to be presented firmly and tightly, with completely natural realism. Rønnaug Alten and Erik Hell maintain this style. But the situation and a number of secondary characters are drawn in strokes that are too thick. The film is solid, but it is also heavy. This simply makes it less entertaining. Astrid Henning-Jensen was not able to overcome this weakness, which has characterized so many Norwegian films."

Cast

Rønnaug Alten as Katinka Stordal
Erik Hell as Stivhatten
Wenche Foss as Elise Gjør
Harald Heide Steen as Justus Gjør
Kolbjørn Buøen as	Peder Stordal
Lydia Opøien as Mrs. Krane
Randi Kolstad as Borghild Stordal
Toralv Maurstad as Jørgen Stordal
Jon Lennart Mjøen as Lydersen
Carl Struve as Buck, a lawyer
Ingeborg Steffens as Miss Sønstegård
Siri Rom as Miss Larsen
Aud Schønemann as Miss Thorsen
Eva Steen as Mrs. Buck
Sigrun Otto as Mrs. Breien
Brita Bigum as Mrs. Berg
Marit Halset as Mrs. Settem
Turid Haaland as Mrs. Fosnes
Harald Aimarsen		
Harald Heide-Steen Jr. as Justus

References

External links
 
 Kranes konditori at Filmfront
 Kranes konditori at the National Library of Norway
 Kranes konditori at the Swedish Film Database

1951 films
Norwegian drama films
Norwegian black-and-white films
1950s Norwegian-language films
Films directed by Astrid Henning-Jensen